Life & Times may refer to:

 Life & Times (TV series), a public affairs television program on KCET
 Life and Times (TV series), a documentary series on CBC Television
 Life and Times (Jim Croce album), 1973
 Life and Times (Bob Mould album), 2008
 Life & Times, a 1976 album by Billy Cobham
 The Life and Times, an American alternative rock band from Kansas City

See also